Richard André Konopka Ordemann (born 6 August 1994) is a Norwegian taekwondo athlete. He won the gold medal at the 2018 Grand Prix Finals in the under 80 kg category. He has qualified to the 2020 Summer Olympics through the 2021 European Taekwondo Olympic Qualification Tournament.

References

External links
 
 
 
 

Norwegian taekwondo practitioners
1994 births
Living people
People from Nannestad
Universiade medalists in taekwondo
Universiade bronze medalists for Norway
European Games competitors for Norway
Taekwondo practitioners at the 2015 European Games
European Taekwondo Championships medalists
Medalists at the 2017 Summer Universiade
Taekwondo practitioners at the 2020 Summer Olympics
Olympic taekwondo practitioners of Norway
Sportspeople from Viken (county)
21st-century Norwegian people